Aglossa micalialis is a species of snout moth in the genus Aglossa. It was described by Francis Walker in 1859 and is known from Shanghai, China.

References

Moths described in 1859
Pyralini
Moths of Asia